Bradley Station is a bus station located in Gastonia, North Carolina, United States. It serves as a bus terminus for Gastonia Transit (GT) and provides intercity bus service via Charlotte Area Transit System (CATS), Greyhound Lines, and Sunway Charters.

Location
The facility is located at the intersection of Main and Oakland streets in the Downtown Gastonia Historic District; several of the brick commercial buildings, that surround the station, were built around the 1940s and are representative of the architecture of that time. Various businesses and restaurants are within walking distance, as well as the Gastonia Conference Center and Gaston County Courthouse.

History
Bradley Station was opened in 1994; it utilized an existing building that was built in 1980 and converted remnants of North Oakland Street, a result of Norfolk Southern tracks that were sunk
below grade in a deep concrete-lined ravine in the early 1990s, into a circular bus turnaround. In 2020, the station building was expanded with a 50% increase of additional interior space, that allowed for more office space, a break room, training room, and dispatch window. In January 2021, the Bradley Station Dog Park was opened, located next to the station building.

Services

The station is owned by the City of Gastonia and operated by Gaston Transit. The station and the 140-space surface parking lot is open 24-hour; however, the station building is open Monday–Saturday during GT business hours. The station building includes tickets/information, restrooms, and waiting area. Outside, a long J-shaped shelter straddles along the circular bus turnaround, providing a shaded outdoor waiting area. The Bradley Station Dog Park is open daily from 7:00 a.m. to 10:00 p.m.

All GT routes begin or end at the station, Monday–Saturday. CATS operates, Monday–Friday, four morning and one evening express route to the Charlotte Transportation Center, in Uptown Charlotte. Sunway Charters operates two daily stops, 12:10 p.m. to Charlotte and 6:40 p.m. to Boone, with an additional two stops on Friday during ASU Fall/Spring semester.

References

External links
 
 City of Gastonia in Gastonia, North Carolina – Greyhound

Bus stations in North Carolina
Buildings and structures in Gaston County, North Carolina
Transportation in Gaston County, North Carolina
1994 establishments in North Carolina